Mana'o may refer to:

People
Ava Mana'o
Alma Mana'o

Other
"Mana'o", Hawaii Five-0 (2010 TV series, season 1)#ep8

See also
Manao (disambiguation)